The 39th Annual César Awards ceremony, presented by the French Academy of Cinema Arts and Techniques (Académie des Arts et Techniques du Cinéma), was held on 28 February 2014, at the Théâtre du Châtelet in Paris. Me, Myself and Mum received ten nominations, Stranger by the Lake and Blue Is the Warmest Colour both received eight nominations each.

Winners and nominees

Winners are listed first and highlighted in bold:

Presenters 
The following individuals, listed in order of appearance presented awards.

Viewers
The show was followed by 2.3 million viewers. This corresponds to 11.2% of the audience.

See also
 19th Lumières Awards
 4th Magritte Awards
 26th European Film Awards
 86th Academy Awards
 67th British Academy Film Awards

References

External links

 César Awards website
 
 39th César Awards at AlloCiné

2014
2014 in French cinema
2014 film awards